Daniel Percival is a retired English television, theatre and film actor.

Early life and education
Percival was born in Leeds, Yorkshire, England. He attended Leeds University, before moving to study at RADA from 2002 to 2005, where he obtained an Acting RADA diploma and a BASSC Certificate in stage combat (RADA Best Armed Fight).

Filmography

Against the Dark (formerly known as Last Night) (2008) - Dylan
Lost In Austen (2008) (TV series) - Michael Dolan
Exodus (2007) - Moses
Van Wilder: The Rise of Taj (2006) - Pipp Everett, the Earl of Grey
Sinchronicity (2006) (TV series) - Jase
Vital Signs (2006) (TV series) - Will Massey
The Golden Hour (2005) (TV series) - Ben

Stage performance
Cymbeline (Arviragus), directed by Declan Donnellan (Cheek by Jowl World Tour)
Hitting Town - Ralph, a play by Stephen Poliakoff, directed by Gemma Kerr (Southwark Playhouse, London, March 2006)
Never the Sinner - Court Clerk (Arts Theatre)
Othello - Iago (Leeds University)
Marat Sade - Marquis de Sade (Leeds University)
The Ragged Child - The Teacher
Macbeth at the RSC-Mentieth, and Macduff's understudy
Merchant of Venice at the RSC- Lorenzo

Performances at the Royal Academy of Dramatic Art
Title - Played Character (Director)
Don Juan Comes To War - Don Juan (Gadi Roll)
The Days of Commune - Delegate Delescluze, Theirs, Commissionaire (Nicholas Barter)
The Rivals - Captain Absolute (Bardy Thomas)
The Knight of the Burning Pestle - Merrythought (Nick Hutchison)
The Government Inspector - Petr Bobchinsky (Rubasingham)

External links
 
 RADA Profile (Web Archive)
 PFD Agent Profile (Web Archive)
 Guardian theatre review "Hitting town"

English male television actors
English male film actors
English male voice actors
English male stage actors
Living people
1980 births
Alumni of the University of Leeds
Alumni of RADA
British directors